An Easter Sepulchre is a feature of British church interior architecture.

Description

The Easter Sepulchre is an arched recess generally in the north wall of the chancel, in which from Good Friday to Easter day were deposited the crucifix and sacred elements in commemoration of Christ's entombment and resurrection. It was generally only a wooden structure, which was placed in a recess or on a tomb.

Distribution
The Easter Sepulchre is only found in England and Wales, the practice having been peculiar to the Sarum Rite.  However, there is a ruin presumed to be an Easter sepulchre at Kildrummy in north-east Scotland.

Use

The Easter Sepulchre contained the Blessed Sacrament of the altar, the Host. Following the doctrine of the Real Presence, i.e. that Jesus is physically present within in the Host, on Good Friday the Host was taken from the tabernacle where it had been placed following the Maundy Thursday celebration of the Last Supper and, wrapped in linen cloths, 'buried' in the Easter sepulchre which was found on the north wall of the sanctuary. Cut into the wall, it was sometimes ornately carved but within it was a wooden frame on which was hung a cloth pall often embroidered with scenes from the Passion. Candles were lit around the sepulchre, burial clothes adorned it, and parishioners stood guard until early Easter morning at the first Mass. The Host was brought out, in imitation of Jesus having arisen out of the tomb, and was placed again in the tabernacle in the centre of the Church.  Like Roods and their lofts, Easter Sepulchres were the object of iconoclastic fury by the Protestant Reformers, and few are left.

Surviving examples

There are throughout Great Britain many fine examples in stone, some of which are Decorated Gothic, such as:

Cumbria
Warwick Bridge

Devon

Holcombe Burnell
Bishops Nympton
Heanton Punchardon
Monkleigh
St Mary's Church, Berry Pomeroy
Throwleigh

Dorset
Gillingham
Tarrant Hinton

Glamorgan
Coity

Herefordshire
Ledbury

Lincolnshire
Navenby
Heckington (1370)

London
St John the Divine, Kennington

Norfolk
Fritton
Kelling
St Andrew's Church, Northwold

Nottinghamshire
Sibthorpe
Hawton (1370)
Arnold

Oxfordshire
Bampton
Piddington

Suffolk
Cockfield
East Harling
Long Melford
 St Margaret South Elmham

Warwickshire
Long Itchington
Withybrook, Coventry

West Sussex
St Catherine of Siena Church, Cocking

East Riding of Yorkshire
Patrington

See also
Holy Sepulchre
Tomb of Jesus

Notes

References
Attribution

Church architecture
Easter liturgy
Holy Week